Geoffrey Neil Kellow is an Australian philatelist who signed the Roll of Distinguished Philatelists in 2009.

References

Australian philatelists
Signatories to the Roll of Distinguished Philatelists
Living people
Year of birth missing (living people)